The 1999 Southend-on-Sea Council election took place on 6 May 1999 to elect members of Southend-on-Sea Unitary Council in Essex, England. One third of the council was up for election and the council stayed under no overall control.

After the election, the composition of the council was
Conservative 19
Liberal Democrat 12
Labour 8

Election result
Before the election the Conservatives needed a swing of less than 5% in order to win a majority on the council, but despite targeting the council they failed to take control. However they came within a single vote of a majority, after Labour came top in both of the seats that were being contested in Milton ward. The second Labour candidate for the ward, Stephen George, was only one vote ahead of the sitting Conservative councillor, Joyce Lambert, thus preventing the Conservatives from holding the critical seat that would have seen them win control of the council.

The Conservatives did gain one seat from the Liberal Democrats in Leigh ward, as the Liberal Democrats lost votes across the council. This saw a number of close results for the Liberal Democrats as they only held Prittlewell by 5 votes from the Conservatives and Westborough by 4 votes over Labour. Overall turnout in the election was 26.5%.

The results meant that the Liberal Democrat and Labour administration, which had run the council for the previous 5 years, would continue.

Ward results

References

1999
1999 English local elections
1990s in Essex